HD 30669 is a yellowish-orange hued star located in the southern constellation Caelum, the chisel. It has an apparent magnitude of 9.11, making it readily visible in small telescopes but not to the naked eye. The object is relatively close at a distance of 188 light years, based on parallax measurements from Gaia DR3.

Characteristics
HD 30669 has a stellar classification of G8/K0 V — a main sequence star with the characteristics of a star with a class of G8 and K0. It has alternatively been given a class of G9 V. It has 92% the mass of the Sun and 91% its radius. Like most planetary hosts, HD 30669 is metal enriched, having a metallicity 35% above solar levels. The star is extremely chromopsherically inactive and is estimated to be  billion years old.

Planetary System
In 2015, C. Motou and colleagues discovered a long period exoplanet orbiting the star during a HARPS survey. It has nearly half the mass of Jupiter and it takes over  years to revolve HD 30669 in a slightly eccentric orbit.

References

G-type main-sequence stars
K-type main-sequence stars
Planetary systems with one confirmed planet

Caelum

030669
022320
CD-28 01759